Surabaya is a city in East Java, Indonesia.

Surabaya may also refer to:

 Surabaya, an urban village in Sungai Serut, Bengkulu City, Bengkulu, Indonesia
 Surabaya, a village in East Sakra, East Lombok Regency, West Nusa Tenggara, Indonesia
 Surabaya, a village in Balubur Limbangan, Garut Regency, West Java, Indonesia

See also
 
 
 , a Royal Netherlands Navy coastal defence ship renamed Soerabaja